Saraburi is one of the central provinces (changwat) of Thailand.  Neighboring provinces are (from north clockwise) Lopburi, Nakhon Ratchasima, Nakhon Nayok, Pathum Thani, and Ayutthaya. It is believed to have been constructed in the year 1548 during the reign of King Maha Chakkraphat of Ayutthaya as a centre for recruiting troops.

Geography 

Saraburi is on the east side of the Chao Phraya River valley. The eastern part of the province is covered by high plains and plateaus, while the western part is mostly low flat plains. Saraburi province has   of forest or 24.2 percent of provincial area. The town, as a gateway to the northeastern region, is 108 km from Bangkok. It occupies an area of 3,577 square kilometres.

National parks
There area a total of three national parks, two ofwhich are in region 1 (Saraburi branch) and Khao Yai in region 1 (Prachinburi) of Thailand's protected areas. 
 Namtok Chet Sao Noi protects  around a scenic waterfall.
Namtok Sam Lan protects the Khao Sam Lan Forest, which consists of hilly landscape and is the source to several rivers and waterfalls. The highest elevation is the Khao Khrok at 329 m. The  area was declared a national park in 1981.

History 
Saraburi has been an important city since ancient times. It is assumed to have been established about 1549 during the reign of King Maha Chakkraphat of the Kingdom of Ayutthaya. It is assumed that the king ordered parts of Lopburi and Nakhon Nayok to be combined to set up Saraburi Province with the aim of mobilizing citizens during times of war. From the Ayutthaya period, the story of Saraburi is usually related to battles and wars. As for the origin of the word "Saraburi", it is assumed that due to its location near a swamp called "Bueng Nong Ngong", when the town was established a combination of sa ('swamp') and buri ('town') was suggested and the town was named "Saraburi".Lopburi and Nakhon Nayok to be combined to set up Saraburi Province with the aim of mobilizing citizens during times of war. From the Ayutthaya period, the story of Saraburi is usually related to battles and wars. As for the origin of the word "Saraburi", it is assumed that due to its location near a swamp called "Bueng Nong Ngong", when the town was established a combination of sa ('swamp') and buri ('town') was suggested and the town was named "Saraburi".

Climate 
Saraburi has a tropical savanna climate, Aw (Climate Classification system of Koppen)  The climate is arid with little rain in winter, relatively high temperatures in summer, cool in winter, and rain from May to October, about 70–90 days

The average annual temperature is 28-29 degrees Celsius. Maximum temperatures average 33-34 degrees Celsius and minimum temperature averages 23–24 degrees Celsius. April is the hottest month of the year, while winters are cool in January.

Air quality
Saraburi has poor air quality resulting from cement production, chiefly stone crushing. In the area of Na Pra Lan Sub-district there are 133 plants, 17 mining sites, 32 stone mill plants, and 22 stone dressing plants. Air quality in the province frequently exceeds recommended limits for particulates.

Education
There are 366 schools. There are a total of 125,255 students at all levels.

Economy 
In 2007 Saraburi's population had an average income per capita 214,537 baht per year, making it tenth highest in the country, second in the central provinces. Annual GDP was 129,275 million baht.

Religion and culture
In 2007, Saraburi's population was 89.34 percent Buddhist, 597,138 people. There are 499 temples. There are total of 3,443 monks and 274 neophytes. Muslims number 953 (0.32 percent). There are five Christian churches.

Symbols 
The provincial seal shows the temple Wat Phra Buddha Baat. In the 17th century a hunter found a puddle of water which looked like a large footprint. It was declared a footprint of Buddha, and a temple was built around it. Phra Phutthabat means footprint of Buddha.

The provincial tree is Lagerstroemia floribunda and the provincial flower is the yellow cotton tree (Cochlospermum regium). The endemic crab, Larnaudia larnaudii is the provincial aquatic animal.

Administrative divisions

Provincial government

The province is divided into 13 districts (amphoe). The districts are further divided into 111 subdistricts (tambon) and 965 villages (muban).

Local government
As of 26 November 2019 there are: one Saraburi Provincial Administrative Organization - PAO and 38 municipal (thesaban) areas in the province. Saraburi, Kaeng Khoi, Phra Phutthabat and Thap Kwang have town (thesaban mueang) status. Further 34 subdistrict  municipalities (thesaban tambon).
The non-municipal areas are administered by 70 Subdistrict Administrative Organizations - SAO (ongkan borihan suan tambon).

Transport

Rail
Saraburi's main station is Saraburi Railway Station. There is a major rail junction at Kaeng Khoi Junction.

Road
Saraburi can be reached on Phahonyothin Road (Thailand Route 1). Mittraphap Road (Thailand Route 2) is a main road in the northeastern region. It has a beginning here which is a route that separates from the right side of Phahonyothin Road.

Health 
The main hospital of Saraburi is Saraburi Hospital, operated by the Ministry of Public Health.

Human achievement index 2017

Since 2003, United Nations Development Programme (UNDP) in Thailand has tracked progress on human development at sub-national level using the Human achievement index (HAI), a composite index covering all the eight key areas of human development. National Economic and Social Development Board (NESDB) has taken over this task since 2017.

Notable people 
 

 Arthit Tanusorn (born 1975), retired footballer

References

External links 

 Provincial page, Tourist Authority of Thailand
Khao Yai National Park
 Saraburi history in Thai language 

 
Provinces of Thailand